The Halsey House is a historic house converted into a museum, in Southampton, New York. It was built circa 1683 by Thomas Halsey Jr., the son of pioneer Thomas Halsey Sr.

The house has been restored, and is open to the public as a museum. It is filled with many of the same items that were owned by Thomas Halsey's family and other relics. The collection on display includes 17th- and 18th-century furnishings, a Dominy clock, and a rare 16th-century Breeches Bible, this version speaks of Adam and Eve wearing "breeches made of fig leaves."
The Halsey estate in Southampton, New York, includes herb and flower gardens and an orchard that are overseen by the Southampton Colonial Society.

The Halsey House is also a common gathering place for social events and a variety of programs open to the public.

See also
List of the oldest buildings in New York

References

External links
Southampton Historical Museum
Hamptons.com Article
New York Times article on Long Island history
New York Times Article on Halsey House Renovation
Old Halsey House Pictures
Historic Structure Report - Prepared for the Southampton Historical Museum (Southampton Colonial Society) by Robert Hefner,

Museums in Suffolk County, New York
Historic house museums in New York (state)
Houses in Suffolk County, New York
Southampton (village), New York